Dumbell is an alternative spelling of dumbbell, a type of weight-training gear.

Dumbell may also refer to:

People
 Alured Dumbell (1835–1900), Manx judge, son of George Dumbell
 George Dumbell (1804–1887), Manx advocate, businessman and philanthropist 
 John Dumbell, (1859–1936), New Zealand rugby union player
 Keith Dumbell (1923–2018), English virologist

Other
 Dumbell's Bank of the Isle of Man founded by George Dumbell, whose insolvency in 1900 caused the "Black Saturday"
 Dumbell Mountain in state of Washington, United States
 Upper Dumbell Lake in Qikiqtaaluk Region, Nunavut, northernmost lake in the world

See also
 Dumbbell (disambiguation)